Veshkayma is the name of several inhabited localities under the administrative jurisdiction of Veshkaymsky Settlement Okrug in Veshkaymsky District of Ulyanovsk Oblast, Russia.

Urban localities
Veshkayma (urban locality), a work settlement

Rural localities
Veshkayma (rural locality), a selo